Jessica Uhl is the vice chair of Mission Possible Partnership, an independent director of Goldman Sachs, and a member of the School of International and Public Affairs, Columbia University (SIPA) Center on Global Energy Policy advisory board. She is a former CFO of Shell and serves as a director. She has been recognized as one of the top 50 "Most Powerful Women" by Forbes for her global leadership, and by Fortune for her business leadership.

Biography
Uhl was raised in California and has degrees from the University of California, Berkeley and INSEAD. She is married and has three children.

Career
She worked for Enron and Citibank.

Uhl joined Shell in 2014, later serving as CEO and CFO, in The Netherlands and in the UK. In 2016, she became the second woman to be appointed as its CFO, after Judy Boynton (2001–2004). She served in the role for five years, stepping down when the company moved its headquarters to London, UK in 2021. Shell credits her as "a key architect of strategic changes, including the simplification of the company’s share structure and the relocation of the corporate HQ".

In October 2019, she was ranked 24th on Fortune list of Most Powerful International Business Women, and as 35th among "The World’s 100 Most Powerful Women" in 2021 by Forbes.

Nominated in March 2021, Uhl became a non-executive director of Goldman Sachs the following month.

In 2021, she was named to The Global OUTstanding LGBT+ Role Model lists, which showcases the 50 top LGBT+ business leaders in the world. On September 9, 2021, Institutional Investor magazine recognized her as the best CFO in her sector amongst European corporations.

Nominated in March, Uhl is slated to join the board of General Electric in May 2023.

References 

Shell plc people
American chief financial officers
UC Berkeley College of Letters and Science alumni
INSEAD alumni
Enron employees
Citigroup employees
Women chief financial officers
Businesspeople from California
1960s births
Living people
Year of birth uncertain
Directors of Goldman Sachs